Opto Circuits (India) Limited (OCI) is a vertically integrated multinational medical technology Group that specializes in primary, acute and critical care products for the global markets. Group companies such as Criticare, Eurocor, Mediaid, AMDL and Unetixs Vascular are leaders in cardiac and vital signs monitors, emergency cardiac care equipment, vascular treatments and sensing technologies. The Company's USFDA listed and CE marked products are marketed in more than 150 countries and sold through direct and indirect sales channels across many emerging and developing economies.

History
Opto Circuits Limited was established in 1991 in Bangalore. It went public in 2000, with a listing on the Bombay Stock Exchange and the National Stock Exchange.

The company was listed in Asia's Best under a Billion list by Forbes magazine in 2011.

Products
Opto Circuits specializes in cardiac and vital signs monitoring, emergency cardiac care, vascular treatments and sensing technologies.

References

Manufacturing companies based in Bangalore
Medical technology companies of India
Indian companies established in 1992
1992 establishments in Karnataka
Manufacturing companies established in 1992
Companies listed on the National Stock Exchange of India
Companies listed on the Bombay Stock Exchange